The Berkshire Downs are a range of chalk downland hills in South east England split between the counties of Berkshire and Oxfordshire. They are part of the North Wessex Downs Area of Outstanding Natural Beauty. The western parts of the downs are also known as the Lambourn Downs.

Geography 
The Berkshire Downs run east–west, with their scarp slope facing north into the Vale of White Horse and their dip slope bounded by the course of the River Kennet. Geologically they are continuous with the Marlborough Downs to the west and the Chilterns to the east.  In the east they are divided from the Chilterns by Goring Gap on the River Thames. In the west their boundary is generally taken to be the border between Berkshire and Wiltshire, although the downs in Wiltshire between the Berkshire border and the valley of the River Og are sometimes considered to be part of the Berkshire Downs.

History 
English downland has attracted human habitation since prehistoric times. The ancient track known as the Ridgeway runs along the Berkshire Downs.  Prehistoric sites in the Downs include Wayland's Smithy (Neolithic), numerous tumuli (Neolithic or Bronze Age), Uffington White Horse (Bronze Age), Liddington Castle and Uffington Castle (Bronze Age and Iron Age), and Segsbury Camp and Grim's Ditch (Iron Age).

It is generally thought that in Anglo-Saxon times the downs were known as Æscesdūn or Ashdown, and that it was here that the Battle of Ashdown was fought in 871.

In 1915, after a brief stint as a hospital orderly at the British hospital for French soldiers in Haute-Marne, John Masefield moved to his country retreat at Lollingdon Farm. The setting at the foot of the Downs - Masefield's "Lollingdon Downs" would inspire a number of poems and sonnets.

Economy 
Downland pasture is firm and well drained, suited to grazing sheep and grazing and training horses. Horse racing is a major business in the area, with much of the downs covered with training areas, and stables centred on the village of Lambourn.

Railway links 
From  to  trains run along the Reading to Taunton Line in the River Kennet Valley to reach Devon on the quickest route from London.

References 

Hills of Berkshire
Hills of Oxfordshire
Hills of Wiltshire